The Unsaid is a 2001 American thriller/drama film directed by Tom McLoughlin and starring Andy García that was released in 2001. It is also known under the name The Ties That Bind and its working title Sins of the Father. The film was released straight to DVD in the US, UK, and Canada but premiered in theaters in other parts of Europe and Asia.

The film follows Michael Hunter's (García) struggle to cope with his son's suicide and his attempt to rehabilitate Thomas Caffey (Vincent Kartheiser), who reminds him of his own son.

Plot
"A seemingly-untroubled adolescent carries disturbing secrets that compel a psychiatrist to unearth the patient's gruesome past."

Psychiatrist Michael Hunter and his wife are watching their daughter Shelly's school play. Their son Kyle, who is suffering from depression, stays at home, because he can not stand being among people as he says. While the parents are applauding Shelly, Kyle commits suicide in the family's garage using the exhaust from a car.

Several years later the family has fallen apart because of their loss. Michael retreats, writes books, holds speeches for University students, but he no longer treats patients. When his former student, Barbara Wagner, approaches him asking for help with a case he initially refuses, but then gives in to taking over the case of 17-year-old Thomas "Tommy" Caffey, who witnessed his father murder his mother and repressed the memories. The teenager will be allowed to leave the psychiatric facility in a few weeks when he turns 18. But while working with Tommy, Michael realizes how much the boy reminds him of his own son Kyle and feelings of guilt arise in the psychologist.

In flashbacks and conversations, the viewer receives background information of Kyle's suicide. Michael had his son see a therapist—an old university friend named Harry Quinlan—instead of taking medication. In his son's suicide letter, Michael finds out that Kyle was sexually abused by Quinlan. When Michael tries to confront Quinlan, the therapist won't unlock the front door. Michael goes to the glass back door, through which he sees Quinlan pull a gun out of a drawer. As Quinlan places the barrel in his mouth, Michael angrily yells at him to shoot himself, which the therapist does.

Tommy punches Chloe, a girl on ecstasy, at a party because she tried to force him to have sex. At the same party, Tommy befriends Shelly and they become closer. Shelly tells Tommy about Kyle. From then on, Tommy uses the information in therapy sessions and manipulates Michael, who more and more sees his own son in him.

When Michael visits Tommy's father in prison he finds out that Tommy's mother misused her son as a lover and slept with him regularly. This is the reason why his father, who came home early one day, bludgeoned her to death, and why Tommy reacts violently when women try to have physical contact with him. However, Mr. Caffey had always said it was because he found out his wife had a lover, running away, and tells Michael he'll deny all of that if he repeats that.

In the last part of the movie, Tommy tries to make Barbara release him to an independent life immediately. When she refuses and touches him, he pushes her through a glass window. After she crawls to a telephone and attempts to call police, Tommy beats her with the handset. He flees in a car stolen from Troy and, armed with a handgun, picks up Shelly from her mother's house and speeds away. Michael finds the severely wounded Barbara in her apartment. Just before being placed in the ambulance, Barbara warns Michael about Tommy's plan. Michael races to his ex-wife's house, narrowly missing the boy and Shelly, whom he chases. The boy's flight comes to an end near train tracks, where he holds Shelly at gunpoint. Michael confronts Tommy with what his mother did and Tommy surrenders the girl and the gun. When a train approaches, Tommy tears loose from Michael's embrace and runs onto the tracks. At the last second, Tommy stops on the tracks, throws up his arms, and awaits impact. Michael grabs Tommy and they fall away from the locomotive.

In the closing scene, Michael and Tommy light-heartedly play handball at a mental institution.

Cast

Awards
 International Film Festival of Marrakech, 2001
 Won Audience Award - Tom McLoughlin
 Nominated Golden Star - Tom McLoughlin

References

External links 
 
 
 

2001 films
2001 independent films
2001 thriller drama films
American independent films
American thriller drama films
Films about depression
Films about dysfunctional families
Films about psychiatry
Films about suicide
Films directed by Tom McLoughlin
Films scored by Don Davis (composer)
Films shot in Saskatchewan
Incest in film
Universal Pictures direct-to-video films
2001 drama films
2000s English-language films
2000s American films